European capital may refer to:
the capitals of the European countries (see List of national capitals)
the Capital of the European Union (usually in reference to Brussels, often alongside Strasbourg and sometimes with Luxembourg City)
Strasbourg, as headquarters of the Council of Europe
the European Capital of Culture
A political party in Ukraine